Werner Mücke was an Austrian luger who competed in the late 1970s and early 1980s. A natural track luger, he won two medals in the men's doubles event at the FIL World Luge Natural Track Championships with a silver in 1979 and a bronze in 1980.

Mücke also won the gold medal in the men's double event at the 1978 FIL European Luge Natural Track Championships in Aurach, Austria.

References
 Natural track European Championships results 1970–2006.
 Natural track World Championships results: 1979–2007

Austrian male lugers
Year of birth missing (living people)
Living people